Roger Hawkenshaw or Hakenshawe (died 1434) was an Irish judge and Privy Councillor.

He was Irish by birth. He was possibly the son, but more likely the grandson, of the earlier Roger Hawkenshaw, or Hackenshawe, a senior Crown official who was Escheator of Ireland in the 1370s. This Roger Hawkenshaw died in 1375.

The younger Roger is first heard of in 1409, when Richard Petir, who was mentioned in the [[Patent Roll ]in 1400 as a clerk in the royal service, appointed him as one of his attorneys to manage his Irish affairs during his absence abroad. In 1415 he was appointed a temporary judge on a panel of five (which included James Uriell) to hear an action for novel disseisin against Alice Brown of Brownstown, County Kildare. He was appointed second justice of the Court of King's Bench (Ireland) in 1416, on the death of John  Bermyngham, at a salary of £20 a year, and in the same year he acted as Deputy to the Lord Chancellor of Ireland, Thomas Cranley, who was an old man even by modern standards and was frequently too infirm to carry out his duties (he died the following year). Roger also acted from time to time as Deputy to Cranley's successor, Sir Laurence Merbury. Soon after his appointment he and Richard  Ashwell, a senior clerk in Chancery and future judge, were ordered to prepare all the Chancery writs, as the Chancellor's frequent absences meant that he could not perform such administrative tasks.

In 1418 he was one of those given permission by the Crown to found a new Chapel, called St. John's Chapel, near Dublin, as was his future colleague Reginald de Snyterby. Whether the chapel was ever built is uncertain. In the same year he was granted property in  Ardee.

In 1420 the Crown, having received numerous complaints from the citizens of  County Meath of illegal seizure of foodstuffs and other property by the troops and purveyors of the Lord Lieutenant of Ireland, appointed Roger and  his colleague Richard Sydgrave to inquire into the matter. 

Roger was reappointed to the King's Bench in 1422, at the start of the reign of Henry VI. He received the same salary of £20, plus a small daily payment called "wages". In 1425 the Council ordered that the arrears of his salary be paid. In 1427 he complained again that his fees were in arrears. The Crown ordered the Treasury to investigate, and it was found that the fees were indeed in arrears to the sum of £127. The Crown duly ordered the fees to be paid. In the same year he was appointed one of the justices and Keepers of the Peace for County Meath.

He was ex officio a member of the Privy Council of Ireland. He attended at least one important meeting of the Privy Council in December 1428, which debated the question of whether the Lord Treasurer of Ireland could act through a Deputy while he was absent in England.

Roger is thought to have died in 1434.

Justices of the Irish King's Bench
Members of the Privy Council of Ireland
1434 deaths

Sources
Ball, F. Elrington The Judges in Ireland 1221-1921 London John Murray 1926
Haydn, Joseph The Book of Dignities London Longman Green Brown and Longmans 1851
Smyth, Constantine Joseph Chronicle of the Law Officers of Ireland London Butterworths 1839

References